Adaklu District is one of the eighteen districts in Volta Region, Ghana. Originally it was formerly part of the then-larger Adaklu-Anyigbe Districton 13 August 2004, until the western part of the district was split off to create Adaklu District on 28 June 2012; thus the remaining part has been renamed as Agotime-Ziope District (under the then-president John Atta Mills government). The district assembly is located in the central part of Volta Region and has Adaklu Waya as its capital town.

Administration 
The district is headed by a District Chief Executive appointed by the President of Ghana in consultation with the local District Assembly. The Assembly consists of elected representatives. The district is represented in the parliament of Ghana by the Member of Parliament for the Adaklu constituency whose boundaries coincide with that of the district.

References 

Districts of Volta Region

States and territories established in 2012